Center Hill Lake is a reservoir in the U.S. state of Tennessee. It is located in Middle Tennessee near Smithville. Created by means of a dam constructed by the U.S. Army Corps of Engineers in 1948, the lake has a dual purpose: electricity production and flood control. Center Hill Lake is one of four major flood control reservoirs for the Cumberland; the others being Percy Priest Lake, Dale Hollow Reservoir, and Lake Cumberland.

Geography 
The lake is well known for water recreation and fishing.
Major tributaries of Center Hill Lake include the Caney Fork (the main tributary) and the Falling Water River.

Edgar Evins, Burgess Falls and Rock Island State Parks contain portions of the lake's shoreline, the rest of which has been relatively underdeveloped until recent years. Lately, the area surrounding Center Hill Lake has been the target of land developers, who have begun construction on several upper-middle-class vacation homes and condos. Some locals protest that these actions are destroying the beauty of nature that make it such an attractive locale for such developments.

History

1940-1948: Construction 
In the aftermath of the December 7, 1941 attack on Pearl Harbor, the U.S. Congress authorized the use of War Department funds to build dams at Center Hill and Dale Hollow that would generate the power required to support defense industry in the Southeastern United States.

In early 1942, the Corps opened bidding to private contractors. An $11,666,000 contract was awarded to a joint venture firm made up of the Massman Construction Company, Metcalf Construction Company and Gordon Hamilton Contracting Company.

Wartime manpower and material shortages began to slow work on the dam beginning in fall of 1942.

In 1943, the Corps suspended construction on Center Hill to focus on the completion of the dam at Dale Hollow.

After World War II ended, construction resumed in January 1946. Modifications to the Rivers and Harbors Act authorized Center Hill Dam for power production. Construction of the dam's basic flood control mechanisms was completed in  November 1948 and Center Hill Lake was created as the reservoir was filled.

1949-1951: Completion of Power Production Facilities 
To avoid a loss of momentum, the existing contract with Massman-Metcalf-Gordon was modified to include the construction of power producing facilities. Construction ended in spring of 1951 and totaled around $43 million.

2007: Risk for Failure 
In January 2007, the U.S. Army Corps of Engineers placed Center Hill Dam under a high risk for failure, along with Wolf Creek Dam in Russell County, Kentucky. In 2008, the lake's water level was lowered between five and ten feet relieve pressure on the dam and allow repairs begin.

2008-2020: Repairs and Reopening 
Center Hill Dam required three phases of repair work that cost an estimated $353 million. Work began in 2008 and reached completion in 2020. Between 2005 and 2020, the lake's water levels were reduced by as much as 18 feet.

During the first phase of repairs, concrete was pumped into the foundation to fill gaps that formed as the structure decayed. In the second phase, a 308-foot tall foundation wall was installed on the dam's lake side to stop leaks through the limestone. The third phase saw the construction of an additional auxiliary dam on Center Hill Dam's eastern side to be used to reduce pressure on the main dam during a major flood.

Improvements were made by the Army Corps of Engineers to recreational areas around the lake and the parking lot was greatly expanded.

References

External links
Center Hill Lake information and travel resources. 
U.S. Army Corps of Engineers: Hot Topics — Information concerning seepage at Center Hill Dam
Historic American Engineering Record (HAER) documentation, filed under Caney Fork River at State Highway 96, Smithville, De Kalb County, TN:

Dams in Tennessee
Historic American Engineering Record in Tennessee
Reservoirs in Tennessee
Protected areas of DeKalb County, Tennessee
Protected areas of Putnam County, Tennessee
Protected areas of Warren County, Tennessee
Protected areas of White County, Tennessee
United States Army Corps of Engineers dams
Bodies of water of DeKalb County, Tennessee
Bodies of water of Putnam County, Tennessee
Bodies of water of Warren County, Tennessee
Bodies of water of White County, Tennessee
1948 establishments in Tennessee
Dams completed in 1948